The Masque of Blackness was an early Jacobean era masque, first performed at the Stuart Court in the Banqueting Hall of Whitehall Palace on Twelfth Night, 6 January 1605. It was written by Ben Jonson at the request of Anne of Denmark, the queen consort of King James I, who wished the masquers to be disguised as Africans. Anne was one of the performers in the masque along with her court ladies, all of whom appeared in blackface makeup. In a ceremony earlier on the day, Charles I of England, Anne's second son (who was still in Scotland at Dunfermline Palace) was given the title of Duke of York.

Plot and themes
The plot of the masque follows the ladies arriving at the royal court to be "cleansed" of their blackness by King James; a stage direction that was impossible to fulfill on stage. They had been instructed by a riddle to seek the land "Britannia". The theme of the masque was a commentary on the Jacobean debate on the Union and the disparate identities of the people of Britain. The Masque of Beauty was written as a sequel to The Masque of Blackness, and originally intended for the following holiday season. It was displaced by Hymenaei, the masque for the wedding of the Earl of Essex and Frances Howard. Beauty was finally performed in 1608.

Design
The sets, costumes, and stage effects were designed by Inigo Jones; Blackness was the first of many masques for the Stuart Court on which Jonson and Jones would collaborate. The music for Blackness was composed by Alfonso Ferrabosco.

Jones designed a raised and mobile stage for the masque, forty feet square and four feet off the floor; this was employed for many subsequent masques. The stage contained inner space for the machines that produced stage effects and the technicians who operated them. The King was often stilling on a stool, resembling the sun. Blackness introduced effects that Jones would repeat with variation throughout his career as a stage designer: it opened with a tempestuous seascape, simulated by flowing and billowing cloths.

The opening stormy sea was populated with six blue-haired merman-like tritons. The gods Oceanus ("blue") and Niger (black) entered, mounted upon giant seahorses. The twelve daughters of Niger, played by the Queen and her ladies in waiting, entered in the company of a dozen nymphs of Oceanus as torchbearers; the ladies of the Court were dressed in tones of silver and azure to contrast with the blackness of the makeup, with pearls and feathers in their hair, while the torchbearers, in green doublets with gold puffed sleeves, had their faces, hands, and hair dyed blue. The ladies rode in a great hollow seashell, which seemed to float upon and move with the waves, and was accompanied by six large sea monsters carrying more torchbearers. (With Blackness as with many subsequent masques designed by Jones, one of the aspects of the show most commented upon by witnesses was the dazzling intensity of light involved...which inevitably says something about the normal conditions of life in the Jacobean era.)

Plot summary
The text begins with Niger talking to his father Oceanus. Oceanus asks him why he has left his usual eastward course and flowed westward, into the Atlantic. Niger tells him that he has come to request help. Niger's daughters are upset because they thought themselves to be the most beautiful goddesses in the world, only to discover that paleness is thought more attractive  - and so no longer feel beautiful. The moon goddess, Aethiopia, tells the daughters that, if they can find a country whose name ends in "tannia", they will be beautiful once more.

The daughters try desperately to find the country whose name ends in "tannia", travelling as far as Mauritania (North Africa), Lusitania (Portugal), and Aquitania (France) in their quest. Despondent at their lack of success they pray once more to Aethiopia, who tells them that the country is Britannia and that they should seek out its sun-like king, who has the power to bleach their black complexions white. Aethiopia further advises the daughters that once a month for the next year, they should bathe in sea-dew and, thus prepared, at the same time next year, they should appear before the king again, whereupon his light will make them beautiful and white.

Cast
The principal cast of the masque:

Queen Anne................Euphoris
Countess of Bedford........Aglaia
Lady Herbert...............Diaphane
Countess of Derby.....Eucampse
Lady Rich........................Ocyte
Countess of Suffolk.......Kathare

Lady Bevill.........................Notis
Lady Effingham...........Psychrote
Lady Elizabeth Howard....Glycyte
Lady Susan Vere.............Malacia
Lady Mary Wroth...............Baryte
Lady Walsingham.........Periphere

A newsletter from court described the cast of the "Queen's mask" in December 1604, noting that three women were excused because of illness, the Countess of Nottingham, the Countess of Richmond who had measles, and the Countess of Northumberland. Lady Hatton was not invited to perform and left court. "Lady Herbert" was Anne Herbert, a daughter of Henry Herbert, 2nd Earl of Pembroke and Mary Sidney.

Responses
The masque was controversial in its day, in part for the production's use of body paint instead of masks to simulate dark skin. One observer, Sir Dudley Carleton expressed his displeasure with the play as such:

Instead of Vizzards, their Faces, and Arms up to the Elbows, were painted black, which was a Disguise sufficient, for they were hard to be known; ... and you cannot imagine a more ugly Sight, than a Troop of lean-cheek'd Moors.

Carleton also made a topical joke, comparing the huge sea-monsters that flanked the shell that housed the nymphs with an unusual sighting of a seal in the Thames at Isleworth, "it came in company with the Sea-fish that drew in our Lady-Moors, and carried a Waiting Gentlewoman and some baggage!".

Another writer described the masque dancers' appearance and the expense; "the Queen and some dozen ladies all paynted like Blackamores, face and neck bare, and for the rest strangely attired in Barbaresque mantells to the halfe legge, having buskins all to be sett with jewells, ... it took the King betweene 4 or £5,000 to execute to Queen's fancy".

A poem, perhaps by John Donne or Henry Goodere, was addressed to one of the masquers, possibly Lucy, Countess of Bedford. It begins, "Why chose shee black; was it that in whitenes, She did Leda equall".

The make-up used could not be quickly removed, so a metamorphosis from black to white was not staged. Anne of Denmark's apothecary John Wolfgang Rumler is known to have devised a more easily removeable blackface make-up for a masque in 1621, The Gypsies Metamorphosed.

The masque was expensive, costing £3000. It caused consternation among some English observers due to the perceived impropriety of the performance. Controversy also stemmed from the predominant role of female actresses playing what were considered traditionally male roles.

The texts of The Masque of Blackness and The Masque of Beauty were published together in quarto form in 1608, by the bookseller Thomas Thorpe; they were reprinted in the first folio collection of Jonson's works in 1616.

Modern criticism
The representation of African people in court masques had precedents both in England and Scotland. Anne of Denmark had African servants. There was a masque involving blackface at the coronation of Christian IV of Denmark in 1596, witnessed by Anne of Denmark's brother, the Duke of Holstein and perhaps, by Inigo Jones.

Kim F. Hall draws attention to The Masque of Blackness and the documented reactions of its audience, in the context of the "growth of actual contact with Africans, Native Americans, and other ethnically different foreigners" and a "collision of the dark lady tradition with the actual African difference encountered in the quest for empire". A "pride in the revival of ancient Britain is continually yoked to the glorification of whiteness". For Bernadette Andrea the masque reveals "complicity with an emerging institutional racism as England's increasing investment in the transatlantic slave trade underwrote its imperialist expansion in to the Americas".

Notes

References 
 Gurr, Andrew. The Shakespearean Stage 1574–1642. Third edition, Cambridge, Cambridge University Press, 1992.
 Jonson, Ben. The Masque of Blackness. 1608. In Ben Jonson: Complete Masques. Ed. Stephen Orgel. New Haven: Yale University Press, 1969. pp. 61–74.
 Leapman, Michael. Inigo: The Troubled Life of Inigo Jones, Architect of the English Renaissance. London, Headline Book Publishing, 2003.

External links
The Masque of Blackness.
Masque of Blackness, Cambridge edition online

Anti-black racism in England
Black people in literature
Masques by Ben Jonson
English Renaissance plays
1605 plays
Anne of Denmark